Peter Morrissey (born 1961) is an Australian fashion designer. He grew up in the Sutherland Shire with his twin sister, Elizabeth, and four brothers and he attended school at Our Lady of Fatima in Caringbah and De La Salle College, Cronulla.

Career
Morrissey has been active in the Australian fashion industry since the 1980s. Until 1996, Morrissey worked with fellow designer Leona Edmiston. After their split, Morrissey formed his eponymous fashion label and enjoyed renewed success. Peter reacquired the Morrissey label in 2011 and maintains collections in the categories of home wares, eyewear, corporate gifts, leather goods and luggage.

Early in 2013, Peter Morrissey launched the Home by Peter Morrissey home wares range available exclusively in Big W department stores throughout Australia.  This follows the success of the Peter Morrissey apparel range in Big W.

GQ Australia named Peter Morrissey 'Man of the Year – Designer' in 2002, while FHM Australia bestowed the same title in 2003 and 2004. Cleo Australia named Peter Morrissey Cleo Maybelline Designer of the Year in 2004.

Qantas engaged Peter Morrissey to design its uniforms in 2003, and also to act as a mentor for their Spirit of Youth Awards. This mentoring relationship ceased in 2009.

In 2009, Morrissey introduced a new budget fashion range for Big W. He was a judge on Project Runway Australia.

Personal life
Morrissey was treated for a cerebral aneurysm in June 2009.

External links 

https://web.archive.org/web/20131110232057/http://www.harrymmiller.com.au/2011/08/10/peter-morrissey-buys-back-his-name-after-14-years/

References

1961 births
Living people
Australian fashion designers
Australian tailors
Suit makers
Businesspeople from Sydney
People educated at De La Salle College, Cronulla